Flavoparmelia baltimorensis, the rock greenshield lichen (from Lichens of North America), is a medium to large foliose lichen with a yellow green upper thallus surface when dry; its lobes are rounded without pseudocyphellae; and the upper surface is covered with globose, pustule-like growths resembling isidia. The lower surface is black with a narrow brown zone at the margins.

Chemistry
Cortex, PD−, K−, KC+ yellowish, C− (usnic acid). 
Medulla, PD+ red-orange, K−, KC+ pink, C− (protocetraric acid, with or without gyrophoric acid).

Habitat
On rock in shaded or exposed areas.

Similar species
The very similar Flavoparmelia caperata  usually grows on the bark of trees, but may be found on rock.  The granular soredia produced in irregular soralia distinguishes it from F. baltimorensis, which lacks true soredia.

Flavopunctelia flaventior and Flavopunctelia soredica have pseudocyphellae in the upper surface of the thallus, and the medulla is C+ red.

Lichen checklists containing Flavoparmelia baltimorensis
A cumulative checklist for the lichen-forming, lichenicolous and allied fungi of the continental United States and Canada. North Dakota State University.

Gallery

References
Recent Literature on Lichens and Mattick's Literature Search. 
USDA Plants Database (Flavoparmelia baltimorensis). 
Index Fungorum (Flavoparmelia baltimorensis).  
Brodo, I. M., S. D. Sharnoff, and S. Sharnoff. 2001. Lichens of North America. Yale University Press, New Haven, 795 pages. 
Hale, M.E., Jr. 1986.  Flavoparmelia, a new genus in the lichen family Parmeliaceae (Ascomycotina). - Mycotaxon 25: 603-605.
Stephen Sharnoff's lichen images. 

Parmeliaceae
Lichen species
Lichens described in 1931
Lichens of North America
Taxa named by Vilmos Kőfaragó-Gyelnik